The 1975 Hockey World Cup was the third edition of the Hockey World Cup men's field hockey tournament. It was held in Kuala Lumpur, Malaysia. In the final, India defeated Pakistan from a goal difference of 2–1. Surjit Singh scored the first crucial goal followed with the winner from Ashok Kumar. It was the second World Cup Final appearance for both the nations; Pakistan was the winner of the inaugural World Cup in 1971, and India, the runner-up of 1973 edition. Germany defeated hosts, Malaysia, with a goal difference of 4–0 for third place.

Qualified teams

Group stage

Pool A

Fixtures

Pool B

The match played between India and West Germany on 7 March 1975 was abandoned due to bad light and was rescheduled for 10 March. The match was played at the Jalan Raja Muda Stadium and was stopped 25 minutes from time after West Germany goalkeeper complained of poor light, and the officials decided to call off the match.

Fixtures

Classification round

Ninth to twelfth place classification

Ninth to twelfth qualifiers

Eleventh and twelfth place

Ninth and tenth place

Fifth to eighth place classification

Fifth to eighth qualifiers

Seventh and eighth place

Fifth and sixth place

First to fourth place classification

Semi-finals
The semi-final match between India and Malaysia was played on 13 March and was called off due to rain nine minutes into the game. It was rescheduled for the following day.

Third and fourth place

Final
In the final match, Indian team faced its traditional archrival Pakistani team. Match was scheduled on 15 March 1975. Ashok Kumar scored the all-important winning goal to achieve India's lone triumph in the World cup.

India Squad
Leslie Fernandez, Ashok Diwan (shirt no. 2), Surjit Singh (4), Michael Kindo, Aslam Sher Khan (5), Varinder Singh (6), Onkar Singh, Mohinder Singh (8), Ajit Pal Singh (7 Captain), Ashok Kumar (17), B. P. Govinda (11), Harcharan Singh (15), Harjinder Singh, Victor Philips (10), Shivaji Pawar (16), P. E. Kalaiah

Pakistan Squad
Saleem Sherwani (shirt no. 1), Manzoor ul Hasan Sr (2), Munawar uz Zaman (3), Salim Nazim (14), Akhtar Rasool (5), Iftikhar Ahmed (6), Islahuddin (7 Captain), Mohammad Azam (15), Manzoor ul Hasan Jr (9), Mohammad Zahid (10), Samiullah Khan (11), Safdar Abbas (16)

Final ranking

See also
1974 Women's Hockey World Cup

References

External links
 Official website
 Men Field Hockey 3rd World Cup 1975

Men's Hockey World Cup
World Cup
Hockey World Cup Men
International field hockey competitions hosted by Malaysia
Hockey World Cup Men
1970s in Kuala Lumpur
Sports competitions in Kuala Lumpur